SAE J3068 "Electric Vehicle Power Transfer System Using a Three-Phase Capable Coupler" is a North American recommended practice published and maintained by SAE International.  J3068 defines electrical connectors and a control protocol for electric vehicles.  It has the formal title "SAE Surface Vehicle Recommended Practice J3068".  J3068 defines a system of conductive power transfer to an electric vehicle using a coupler capable of transferring single-phase and three-phase AC power as well as DC power, and defines a digital communication system for control. J3068 also specifies requirements for the vehicle inlet, supply equipment connector, mating housings and contacts.

History 

Initial discussions in the Electric Power Research Institute's Infrastructure Working Council meetings regarding issues related to three-phase charging in North America led to the development of J3068. There was a lack of non-proprietary, UL  listed equipment that could be legally used in the United States. Some large electric vehicles were being charged without using ground fault protection, and without connectors that automatically de-enegerize when disconnected from the vehicle.

Therefore, SAE authorized a new Task Force to develop a standard that focused on heavy and medium duty applications, and more generally any vehicle charging at commercial and industrial locations or other places where 3φ power (three-phase) is available and preferred. Early within the development of the standard, it was decided that the J3068 connector and inlet would expand upon Europe's IEC 62196 type 2 connector also known as the Mennekes connector.

The control protocol is a variation of LIN which retains the analog voltage level signaling from SAE J1772.  The positive level of the LIN signal waveform can change from 12 volts to 9 or 6 volts (known as State A, State B, and State C in J1772).  An earlier version of this LIN-based control protocol was published in Annex D of IEC 61851 edition 3.  Major contributors to the development of this protocol include ABB in Sweden, the University of Delaware, Vattenfall Sweden, Mack Trucks/Volvo Trucks North America and others.

SAE J3068 (2018) is written from the point of view of a developer using a commercial LIN development package with API support for LIN functionality (which is familiar to embedded controller programming teams in the automotive industry).  The behavior of the EV and EVSE are described separately in terms of the signals they can see on the API. The details of how the LIN signals are sent between the EV and EVSE are assumed to be handled by commercial LIN software.

IEC 61851-1:2017 Annex D does not presume that a commercial LIN development package is used to implement the standard. It leaves the decision how to implement the standard to the developer.

Differences in logic and nomenclature between J3068 and 61851-1 Annex D are detailed in J3068 (2018) Appendix F.

North American Standards  

J3068 states that it aims to cover three-phase equipment which meets applicable North American listing standards.

The core standards for Electric Vehicle Supply Equipment in North America are tri-national standards for Mexico, Canada, and the United States.  See CANENA.  They are essentially equivalent documents with different names in each country.

North American Connector  

The J3068 connector is mechanically identical to the Type 2 connector, because it makes Normative references to IEC 62196-2 and -3. Additionally, J3068 supports voltage ratings which align with North American grid voltages and EVSE standards.  Unlike Europe where the most common type of  three-phase Wye (3φY) power is nominally 400/230 VAC, in North America the three most common 3φ voltages are 208/120, 480/277, and 600/347 VAC.

IEC standards limit single-phase AC charging to 250 VAC (see IEC 62196-2). Three-phase EVSE and single-phase vehicles are designed to be interoperable. A 480 phase-to-phase VAC rating is theoretically allowed in the IEC document but this is mathematically incongruent with the 250 VAC single phase limit. It effectively limits the maximum 3φ rating to 433VAC (250 * ), and means you cannot make a 480/277 VAC EVSE without exceeding the 250 VAC single phase limit. The SAE J3068 standard defines a system for nominal voltage ratings up to 600 VAC, which is also the maximum voltage rating covered by UL 2594.

Where AC voltages and current ratings exceed 250 VAC phase-to-neutral and/or 63 amps, digital communication (LIN-CP) is required.  Even in the case of a North American EV designed to charge from 208/120 VAC three-phase, LIN-CP controls are required unless the EV can at least tolerate 400/230 VAC long enough to signal the EVSE to turn off the power, if it cannot actually charge from 400/230 VAC. This is because the typical European EV designed for three phase charging will be exposed to 400/230 with PWM controls, and there is no guarantee that a North American three-phase EV will not be exposed to European supply voltages if it is exported.

UL 2594 in North America requires any EVSE that supplies more than 250 VAC be permanently wired to the electrical supply (also known as Mains electricity).  In Europe, IEC 61851-1 refers to this hard-wired connection as "Mode 3". J3068 requires EV cord sets to be permanently connected to the EVSE (IEC 61851-1 calls this Case C).

Example 1: A J3068 EVSE supplying 480/277 VAC at up to 100A is sold in the United States. The EVSE will be tested to UL2594 and the grid power will be wired directly into the EVSE. NFPA 70, Article 625, requires the breaker/fuse and wiring be sized for 125A because the load is up to 100A continuous. The vehicle cord set used will be tested to UL 2251 and be permanently attached to the station. Digital communications (LIN-CP) will check the vehicle is compatible with this voltage (480/277 VAC) and indicate maximum charge rate of 100A.

Example 2: An imported passenger EV which only supports 61851-1 Annex A is connected to a 600/347 VAC Canadian EVSE designed to comply with J3068. The vehicle would be protected from potential damage, because the charging station would not close its internal relay. Only a vehicle which supports LIN-CP and indicates it accepts 600 VAC could use the EVSE.

Digital Communication for AC charging (LIN-CP) 

Basic AC charging is defined in SAE J1772 and IEC 61851-1 Annex A with an analog control pilot, and is used with a variety of single-phase AC grid voltages lower than 250 VAC.  LIN-CP, (Local Interconnect Network on the Control Pilot), was originally specified in IEC 61851-1 Annex D in Edition 3.  Unlike PLC over Control Pilot (IEC 15118-2), LIN CP is designed to be a low-cost digital upgrade for the analog PWM controls. 

LIN-CP is similar to the approach used by Tesla based on J2411 (Single-wire CAN), but maintains the CP voltage levels from analog PWM to be compatible with existing EVSE safety models.

LIN transceivers used for J3068 must have an extended supply range. For example, the TI SN65HVDA100-Q1 operates from 5V to 27V. The extended voltage range is required because the LIN transceiver must operate when the Control Pilot is at 6V level (similar to "State C" in J1772).

The upcoming second edition of SAE J3068 recommends a slightly different Pilot circuit from the one defined in SAE J1772 to improve compatibility with PWM signaling.

Compatibility 
While much of the content of the SAE J3068 document is focused on extensions for the higher voltages common in North America compared to Europe, it is noteworthy that all European Type 2 charging systems where the cord is fixed to the station are completely compatible with SAE J3068, whether DC, AC three-phase, or AC single-phase.  (J3068 does not support "Case B" removable cables, because of North American regulations.)  For example, any European EVSE rated for 400/230 VAC that is able to function with 60 Hz 208/120 VAC could be used in North America with no modifications.  It could also be used with Buck-boost transformers to lower 480/277 VAC to an acceptable level, with no internal changes.  (This may not be the most practical approach in many cases, and  safety certifications for insurance coverage in North America differ from European certifications.)  A J3068 EVSE that supplies only 208/120 VAC may function identically to a European EVSE.  For backwards compatibility, EVs may support both J3068 controls and European analog controls unless they are unable to charge at European nominal voltages, or would be damaged by 400/230 VAC (for example, an EV that is optimized for 208/120 VAC might not be able to tolerate 400/230).

The J3068 coupler is defined by reference to the IEC 62196 specifications; there are no mechanical differences. Voltage ratings are higher, but the original coupler was designed to support North American voltages, even if the PWM controls were not.  Underwriters Laboratories standards may allow certification of advanced design implementations at higher currents than the European standard, which is more conservative than other EV charging coupler current densities.  For example, the European 63 amp rating for the Type 2 connector 6 mm pins equates to about 2.23 amps per square mm of cross section, while the 200 amp rating for the 8 mm DC pins (without cooling) equates to 3.98 amps/mm2.

While J3068 focuses on AC6 charging (using the four smaller 6 mm pins), it also defines J3068 DC8 charging which is completely compatible with European Type 2 DC charging using the 8 mm pins (often referred to as "CCS" (combined charging system), although the term "CCS" is not used in the IEC standards documents).  Both systems are identical, J3068 neither adds nor takes away from the existing DC charging standards, but merely references them.  J3068 AC6 is fully interoperable with J3068 DC8, both systems can be implemented in the same vehicle without complication.  Further, the only significant electrical difference between J3068 DC8 and J1772 DC charging is the value of the Proximity resistor.  (The coupler has mechanical differences, of course.)

J3068 AC6 charging using the 6 mm pins may be implemented using older PWM controls (instead of the newer digital LIN controls) if the voltages do not exceed 433 VAC from line to line, and do not exceed 250 VAC from line to neutral.  However, this may not be optimal since a system designed for 400/230 VAC in Europe will probably not deliver sufficient charging power at 208/120 VAC, which is the only common voltage that is compatible with PWM controls in North America.  For this reason, J3068 is best implemented with support for LIN controls in North America.  For example, a charging system on a truck which is optimized for a highest nominal voltage of 208/120 VAC three phase (see Appendix E, figure 19 on page 91 of J3068) might simply refuse to charge if it does not detect LIN controls, thereby protecting itself from possible exposure to 400/230 VAC which is common with PWM controls.  Vehicles that can safely charge from 400/230 VAC and higher might support both LIN and PWM, to maximize the ability to charge at more locations.

Depending on the topology of the vehicle on-board charger, it may be possible to charge from a J1772 EVSE using an adapter.  While adapters are generally discouraged, manufacturer specific adapters might be useful and are allowed in some countries according to IEC.  Such an adapter shall be rated for 80 amps, as there is no practical way to signal the adapter's current rating.  For  example, an on-board charger configured for 480/277 which consists of three single-phase chargers wired from line to neutral, might support an adapter configured that connects L1, L2, and L3 of the J3068 together and to L1 of the J1772 input, and wires N from the J1772 inlet to N on the J3068 inlet.  The vehicle must be able to detect the differences between Proximity pin resistances and must scale the current limit to 1/3 for each charger in this example.  Other configurations are possible depending on the design of the vehicle charger.

Deployment example

On 7 November 2018, Greenlots announced a project to provide charging infrastructure for all electric Volvo Trucks in Southern California.  "According to Greenlots, the project will be one of the first in North America to demonstrate a new heavy-duty vehicle charging standard, SAE J3068, in real-world applications."  See press release.

Equipment availability

Rema USA has ANSI/UL 2251 (USA) and CAN/CSA C22.2 No. 282 (Canada) listed AC6 63A 480VAC three-phase cordsets (52.3 kW), and two DC8 1000VDC cordsets at 125A and 200A. See Underwriters Laboratories listing number E338388.

Nuvve offers three-phase AC EVSE certified to UL and European standards with support for up to 480/277 VAC at 120 amps with SAE J3068 and IEC 61851-1 Annex D compliance, in addition to J1772 and Annex A support at lower voltages.  See Maryland Electrical Testing Labs listing number E114798.

Reference implementations and examples
Developers at the University of Delaware's Transport Electrification Center have posted a reference implementation at GitHub SAE J3068 reference implementation which includes hardware and software.

An alternative LDF may be needed for LIN stacks that don't support the same signal appearing in multiple frames.  See the Transport Electrification Center Blog for a link.

Proprietary protocols in use

A proprietary version is in use in "behind the fence" applications in North America using protocol version 253. The intention is to deprecate this version when the increased functionality is added to SAE J3068 in an updated edition of the recommended practice in the near future.

LIN-CP Version Table

References

Automotive standards
Electric vehicle technologies
Electrical connectors
Automotive technologies